Hagerstown station is a historic railway station in Hagerstown, Washington County, Maryland.  It was built in 1913 as a stop for the Western Maryland Railway. It is a -story hip roof brick building, reflecting the influence of the Commercial Style of the early 20th century.  The building features overscaled classical detailing, a stone foundation, and a massive, modillioned cornice with stone disks defining each bay. The building is also encircled by a one-story porch that has a cantilevered roof on three sides.

The Western Maryland Railway ended passenger train service to the Hagerstown station in June 1957.

The station was listed on the National Register of Historic Places in 1976 as the Western Maryland Railway Station. The building is now used as the headquarters of the Hagerstown Police Department.

References

External links

, including photo from 1991, at Maryland Historical Trust

Buildings and structures in Hagerstown, Maryland
Railway stations in the United States opened in 1913
Hagerstown
Railway stations on the National Register of Historic Places in Maryland
1913 establishments in Maryland
National Register of Historic Places in Washington County, Maryland
Transportation buildings and structures in Washington County, Maryland

Former railway stations in Maryland
Repurposed railway stations in the United States